Mihai Maximilian Popa (born 12 October 2000) is a Romanian professional footballer who plays as a goalkeeper for Liga I club FC Voluntari.

Club career

Early career / Farul Constanța
Popa started practising football at age seven with hometown club Farul Constanța, and two years later moved to the nearby Gheorghe Hagi Academy. He returned to the former side in 2018, going on to make his senior debut on 30 September by playing in a 1–0 Liga II win over Viitorul Târgu Jiu.

Astra Giurgiu
Popa joined Astra Giurgiu in the summer of 2019, but did not feature in any matches during his first year in the Liga I. On 14 February 2020, he was loaned out for the remainder of the season to second league team Rapid București. In a Liga II derby against Petrolul Ploiești on 11 July 2020, Popa was given two yellow cards and sent off for stepping out of the goal-line twice during a penalty kick; Petrolul also missed the subsequent third shot and the game finished goalless.

On 14 November 2020, upon his return to Giurgiu, Popa registered his top flight debut by starting in a 1–1 draw at Dinamo București. On 22 May 2022, he played the full match as Astra lost 2–3 after extra time to Universitatea Craiova in the Cupa României final. Popa appeared in 15 games all competitions comprised during the 2020–21 campaign, which ended in relegation for "the Black Devils".

Voluntari
On 11 August 2021, Popa was transferred to Voluntari for an undisclosed fee, with Astra Giurgiu reportedly retaining 50% participation rights in a co-ownership deal. On 19 May 2022, he was again runner-up in his second successive Cupa României final after a 1–2 loss to Sepsi OSK.

Three days after the final, the Gazeta Sporturilor daily wrote that five-time defending champions CFR Cluj made a €300,000 offer to sign Popa, but on 17 June 2022 the Voluntari Board of Directors decided that he would not be sold for less than €1 million.

International career
In June 2021, Popa was selected in Mirel Rădoi's Romania squad for the postponed 2020 Summer Olympics.

Personal life
Popa's paternal grandfather, Gheorghe, was also a professional footballer. He too played as a goalkeeper for Farul Constanța, between 1969 and 1977.

Career statistics

Club

Honours
Astra Giurgiu
Cupa României runner-up: 2020–21

Voluntari
Cupa României runner-up: 2021–22

References

External links

Mihai Popa at Liga Profesionistă de Fotbal 

2000 births
Living people
Sportspeople from Constanța
Romanian footballers
Association football goalkeepers
Liga I players
Liga II players
FCV Farul Constanța players
FC Astra Giurgiu players
FC Rapid București players
FC Voluntari players
Romania under-21 international footballers
Olympic footballers of Romania
Footballers at the 2020 Summer Olympics